Jordan Allen-Dutton (born April 16, 1977) is an American writer, producer, and director. He is best known for co-creating the play, The Bomb-itty of Errors, and for his writing on the stop motion television series, Robot Chicken.

Biography 
Allen-Dutton was born on April 16, 1977 in Palo Alto, California. He graduated with a B.F.A. degree from New York University (NYU), Tisch School of the Arts at the Experimental Theatre Wing.

In 1999, he co-created and starred in The Bomb-itty of Errors, a so-called "Add-Rap-Tation" of Shakespeare's Comedy of Errors, that mixed hip-hop and Shakespeare. The show debuted in New York (Off-Broadway) at 45 Bleecker St. and went on to run in London (West End), Chicago, Los Angeles, Amsterdam, Edinburgh, Dublin, Florida, Philadelphia, St. Louis, and continues to play around the world. The Bomb-itty is published by Samuel French.

In 2002, Allen-Dutton co-created and starred in the MTV sketch comedy series, Scratch & Burn and attended the Sundance Institute's Screen Writing Lab with a film adaptation of The Bomb-itty of Errors.

In 2004, Allen-Dutton formed Famous Last Nerds with collaborator Erik Weiner their musical comedy Nerds, about Bill Gates and Steve Jobs' rise from garage inventors to titans of the digital age. Weeks before their Broadway debut, Famous Last Nerds was abruptly canceled before performances, due to financial troubles.

Allen-Dutton and Weiner's video Shawshank In A Minute was directed by John Landis and won JibJab's Great Sketch Experiment in 2006. Allen-Dutton co-wrote many songs with Erik Weiner including, "I'm So Straight", "One Line on the Sopranos " and "I Google Myself" produced by Yung Mars.

Allen-Dutton has also written for and produced television shows such as America's Best Dance Crew, Snoop Dogg's Fatherhood, NBC's The Sing-Off, the MTV Movie Awards, the HBO poetry show Brave New Voices and Lip Sync Battle.

In addition to writing and producing Allen-Dutton founded a software company in 2004 called Talking Panda, that creates applications for mobile devices. Talking Panda's software iLingo a talking phrasebook was among the first products in the apple store  and was featured in Time Magazine in the Nov 03, 2008 issue. Talking Panda iLingo was also included in the iPhone App store on the day it launched.

References

External links
 Official website
 Famous Last Nerds
 

American television writers
American male television writers
Television producers from California
Tisch School of the Arts alumni
Living people
1977 births
Writers from Palo Alto, California
Screenwriters from California